Milda Sauliūtė (born August 8, 1981) is a Lithuanian professional basketball player. She plays for VICI Kaunas and Lithuania women's national basketball team. She has represented national team in several EuroBasket Women competitions. She has spent all her career in Lithuania.

Clubs 
 1998–99: Vilniaus Svaja
 1999–2000: Alytaus Snaigė
 2000–01: Vilniaus Lintel 118
 2001–02: Vilniaus Lintel 118
 2002–03: Vilniaus Lintel 118
 2004–05: Marijampolės Arvi (LMKL)
 2005–06: Marijampolės Arvi (LMKL)
 2006–07: Kauno Laisvė (LMKL)
 2008–09: Marijampolės Arvi (LMKL)
 2009–10: Vilniaus TEO (LMKL)
 2010–11: Kauno VIČI-Aistės(LMKL)
 2018-19: Kauno Aistės-LSMU (Moterų lyga)

References

External links 
 FIBA Europe profile
 Basketnews 

Lithuanian women's basketball players
People from Rokiškis
Living people
1981 births
Guards (basketball)